The RFamide peptide family, or the RFamide-related peptides (RFRPs), are a family of neuropeptides. They are characterized by the possession of an Arg-Phe-NH2 motif at their C-terminal extremities.

Members of the family include:

 Neuropeptide FF group
 Neuropeptide AF
 Neuropeptide FF
 Neuropeptide SF (RFRP-1)
 Neuropeptide VF (RFRP-3) (GnIH - avian species)
 Prolactin-releasing peptide (PrRP)
 Pyroglutamylated RFamide peptide (QRFP)
 Kisspeptin (disputed)

See also
 Neuropeptide VF precursor
 FMRFamide

References

Neuropeptides